A Girl with Character is a 1939 Soviet comedy film directed by Konstantin Yudin.

The film featured acting debuts of Mikhail Gluzsky and Anatoly Solovyov.

Plot
The best farm worker Katya Ivanova travels to the district center, in search of truth and the possibility of punishing the director-bureaucrat Meshkov, who collapsed the once prosperous work in the Far East animal-breeding sovkhoz. On the way to the station, Katya manages to catch and pass over a saboteur to the border guards. She then rides the train without a ticket to write a complaint, which means that she has to work as a waitress in the dining car on the way to Moscow. 

On the train, Katya meets a sailor Sergei, but upon arrival in Moscow they lose each other. Katya is employed as a saleswoman in a fur shop and after that at a factory of gramophone records. At the same time she actively convinces female work colleagues to go to the Far East. 

For a long time Sergei looks for Katya and he finally finds her. Meanwhile Katya's complaint is examined. She is appointed as the new director of the farm, instead of the dismissed Meshkov. Katya and her friend Sergei go to the Far East.

Cast
Valentina Serova as Katya Ivanova, worker of the Far-East animal-breeding sovkhoz
Emma Tsesarskaya as Ekaterina Ivanova, wife of the commander
Andrei Tutyshkin as Sergei Beryozkin, sailor
Pavel Olenev as Bobrik, director of the fur store
Pyotr Repnin as Tsvetkov, director of the gramophone record factory
Vsevolod Sanayev as Surkov, lieutenant of the militsiya
Aleksandr Antonov as Mehkov, director of the animal-breeding sovkhoz
Aleksandr Zhukov as train conductor
Sergei Blinnikov as manager of the dining car
Karandash as waiter
Mikhail Gluzsky as border patrol officer
Anatoly Solovyev as red army officer
Nikolai Arskiy as employee of the commissariat
Vladimir Dorofeev as huntsman
Nikita Kondratyev as photojournalist
Galina Kravchenko as mother of a lost child
Ivan Lobyzovskiy as komsomol leader of the gramophone factory
Iona Biy-Brodskiy as the lover of beer in the dining car

Interesting Facts
Filming of one scene took place on the Kratovskaya children's railway.
The film marks the first appearance of the famous song "To the Far East" (music by the Pokrass brothers, lyrics by Eugene Dolmatovski) by Emma Tsesarskaya and Valentin Serov.  The tune "Brown Buttons" was based on the themes of this song.

References

External links

Films directed by Konstantin Yudin
Soviet comedy films
1939 comedy films
1939 films
Soviet black-and-white films
1930s Russian-language films